Badat is a surname. Notable people with the surname include:

Alon Badat (born 1989), Israeli footballer
 Saajid Badat (born 1979), British Islamist terrorist
 Yunus Badat (born 1943), East African cricketer

See also
 Sadat

Arabic-language surnames